Lombe Scott Honaker (September 25, 1888 – September 5, 1964) was an American college football and basketball player and coach. He served as the head football coach at Lincoln College (Illinois) from 1914 to 1916, Baldwin Wallace College from 1917 to 1918, Southwestern University in Georgetown, Texas from 1919 to 1920, and Maryville College in Maryville, Tennessee from 1921 to 1958.

Head coaching record

Football

Notes

References

External links
 

1888 births
1964 deaths
Roanoke Maroons football players
Baldwin Wallace Yellow Jackets football coaches
Basketball coaches from Virginia
Southwestern Pirates football coaches
Southwestern Pirates men's basketball coaches
Maryville Scots football coaches
Maryville Scots men's basketball coaches
People from Bland County, Virginia